Denner is a name. Notable people with the name include:

Given name
Denner (footballer, born 1993), Denner Paulino Barbosa, Brazilian football left-back
Denner (footballer, born 1999), Denner Fernando Melz, Brazilian football midfielder

Surname
Balthasar Denner (1685–1749), German painter
Charles Denner, French actor
Jacob Denner, woodwind instrument maker, son of Johann Christoph Denner
Johann Christoph Denner, (1655-1707), famous woodwind instrument maker
Pat Denner, American neon sign maker

See also
Denner (supermarkets), Swiss supermarket chain